Tongil station (North Korean official spelling: Thongil Station) is a station on Chŏllima Line of the Pyongyang Metro.

This station was renovated in 2019 to include TVs, LED displays and electronic guide maps were added on platforms and escalators.

Tongil station features embossed copper carvings depicting themes of national reunification.

References

External links
 

Railway stations opened in 1973
Pyongyang Metro stations
1973 establishments in North Korea